Elena Vintilă (born 27 January 1946) is a Romanian athlete. She competed in the women's long jump at the 1972 Summer Olympics and the 1976 Summer Olympics.

References

1946 births
Living people
Athletes (track and field) at the 1972 Summer Olympics
Athletes (track and field) at the 1976 Summer Olympics
Romanian female long jumpers
Romanian pentathletes
Olympic athletes of Romania
Place of birth missing (living people)
Universiade silver medalists for Romania
Universiade medalists in athletics (track and field)